Edward Lee was an American Negro league outfielder between 1909 and 1912.

Lee made his Negro leagues debut in 1909 with the Buxton Wonders. He went on to play with the Leland Giants in 1911 and the French Lick Plutos in 1912.

References

External links
Baseball statistics and player information from Baseball-Reference Black Baseball Stats and Seamheads

Year of birth missing
Year of death missing
Place of birth missing
Place of death missing
Buxton Wonders players
French Lick Plutos players
Leland Giants players
Baseball outfielders